Garo Kahkejian ( [reformed orthography: Կարո Քահքեջյան]; 24 March 1962 – 26 June 1993) was a famed Armenian military commander and participant in the First Nagorno-Karabakh War. He was the founder and commander of the Khachakirner ("Crusaders") volunteer detachment, and was also known by his nickname "The White Bear" (Spitak Arj). Kahkedjian was the first Armenian from the diaspora who volunteered to go and fight in the Artsakh conflict.

Biography
Kahkedjian was born in 1962 in Aleppo, Syria. His grandfather Sahak, commonly known by his nom de guerre Aslan, fought in Western Armenia and Artsakh during the time of the Armenian national liberation movement and was the bodyguard of General Drastamat Kanayan. After graduating from Armenian schools in Aleppo and Lebanon, he moved with his family to Nigeria. in 1978, he moved to Germany to receive a degree in architecture. He graduated from the Faculty of Mechanical Engineering of Frankfurt Engineering University. After his graduation, he lived in Fresno, California.

After the devastating 1988 Spitak earthquake, Kahkedjian arrived in Armenia for the first time, where he assisted the affected communities and helped raise funds from the diaspora.

In the wake of the interethnic violence in Azerbaijan, Kahkedjian organized the "Crusaders" detachment together with Shahe Ajemian and participated in the battles of Martuni, Hadrut, Martakert, Lachin and Kelbajar. During the battle for the height of "Pushkenyal" he fought with his detachment, thus keeping the height until the arrival of Armenian forces. Kahkedjian died on June 26, 1993 near Martakert in battles near the village Maghavuz. He was killed by small-arms fire, according to his brother Tro Kahkejian, who was also a member of the Crusaders unit.

Garo Kahkejian's body rests at the Yerablur military cemetery.

References

External links
 
 Fedayi.ru, Каро "Спитак Арч" Кахкеджян
 Janfedayi.com Karo Qarkedjyan

1962 births
1993 deaths
Syrian people of Armenian descent
People from Aleppo
People from Fresno, California
Armenian soldiers
Armenian military personnel of the Nagorno-Karabakh War
Burials at Yerablur